The 2010 Los Angeles Galaxy season was the club's fifteenth season of existence. It was also the Galaxy's fifteenth season in Major League Soccer and their fifteenth-consecutive year at the top-flight of American soccer.

The club's season was highlighted by winning their third-ever Supporters' Shield. Statistically, the 2010 MLS season was the Galaxy's strongest season on record, and the club had their strongest start ever, opening their first eleven games unbeaten before losing to the eventual second-place finishers, Real Salt Lake at Rio Tinto. Some of the club's notable achievements included Edson Buddle being a runner-up for the MLS Golden Boot award, with 17 goals tallied during the regular season. Galaxy captain and United States national team star Landon Donovan led the club in assists with 12. The club finished the MLS regular season with a 17–7–8 record, their best in nearly a decade.

The club also competed in the preliminary rounds of the CONCACAF Champions League, and the early rounds of the U.S. Open Cup.

In Champions League play, the Galaxy, considered at one point to be favorites to win the entire tournament suffered a shocking blow, when the club suffered a 4–1 home defeat to confederation minnows, Puerto Rico Islanders, who were 11th place at the time in USSF D2 Pro League, the then-second tier of U.S. soccer. Although the Galaxy would defeat the Islanders 2–1 in Puerto Rico, it was not enough on aggregate to see the club advance into Group play. In the tournament, the Galaxy were the only club to defeat the Islanders in Puerto Rico. However, the Galaxy will return to Champions League play next year by winning the Supporters' Shield title.

The Galaxy made it to the quarterfinals of the U.S. Open Cup with a convincing 2–0 win over second-tier AC St. Louis, before losing to Seattle Sounders FC by the same score line.

Background

Review

Pre-season

March 

Los Angeles began their fifteenth Major League Soccer regular season at home with a 1–0 win against the New England Revolution on March 27, 2010. Edson Buddle scored the only goal for the Galaxy in the sixth minute.

April 
David Beckham, with a torn left Achilles tendon injury, was ruled out for the season on April 26.  He suffered the injury in a Serie A match for AC Milan against ChievoVerona on March 13, and as a result, will also miss the entire MLS season.

After scoring a league-leading 7 goals, Edson Buddle was named MLS Player of the Month for April

May

June

July

August

September 
After a quick and incredible recovery, David Beckham returns to the LA Galaxy. He is brought in as a late sub for Juniho during the 70th minute of the September 11 L.A Galaxy vs Columbus Crew match, amidst the roaring cheers and applauds of Galaxy fans. The Galaxy go on to win the match 3–1.

October

Club

First team roster 

As of August 10, 2010.

Technical staff 
{|class="wikitable"
|-
!Position
!Staff
|-
|Head coach/General Manager|| Bruce Arena
|-
|Associate Head Coach|| Dave Sarachan
|-
|Assistant coach/Director of Player Development|| Trevor James
|-
|Assistant coach|| Cobi Jones
|-
|Goalkeeping coach|| Ian Feuer
|-
|Director of Soccer Operations|| David Kammarman
|-
|Athletic Trainer||| Armando Rivas
|-
|Assistant Athletic Trainer||| Cecelia Gutierrez
|-
|Equipment Manager|| Raul Vargas
|-
|Equipment Coordinator|| Rafael Verdin
|-
|Team Administrator|| Shant Kasparian
|-
|Strength & Conditioning Coach|| Ben Yauss
|-
|Active Release Specialist|| Shunta Shimizu
|-

 Management

Transfers

In

Out

Loan

Statistics 

{|class="wikitable"
|-
|Games played || 37 (30 MLS, 3 MLS Playoffs, 2 CONCACAF Champions League, 2 U.S. Open Cup)
|-
|Games won || 22 (18 MLS, 2 MLS Playoffs, 1 CONCACAF Champions League, 1 U.S. Open Cup)
|-
|Games drawn ||  5 (5 MLS)
 |-
|Games lost || 10 (7 MLS, 1 CONCACAF Champions League, 1 MLS Playoffs, 1 U.S. Open Cup)
|-
|Goals scored || 52
|-
|Goals conceded || 38
|-
|Goal difference || +16
|-
|Clean sheets || 13
|-
|Yellow cards || 50
|-
|Red cards || 1
|-
|Worst discipline ||  Omar Gonzalez 8  0 
|-
|Best result(s) ||W 4–0 (A) v Seattle – Major League Soccer – July 2, 2010
|-
|Worst result(s) ||L 4–1 (H) v Puerto Rico – CONCACAF Champions League – July 17, 2010
|-
|Most appearances ||  Donovan Ricketts (32)
|-
|Top scorer ||   Edson Buddle (19)
|-
|Points || Overall: 59/90 (65.55%)
|-

Match results

Major League Soccer

League table 

Conference

Overall

Results summary

Matches

Regular season

Playoffs

U.S. Open Cup 

Finishing in second place overall in 2009, the Galaxy were one of the six MLS clubs guaranteed a Third round spot in the 2010 edition of the U.S. Open Cup. The Galaxy were paired against the USSF Pro League's AC St. Louis. Hosting the Saints at Home Depot Center on June 29, a pair of goals from Chris Klein and Juninho gave the Galaxy a 2–0 victory over visiting St. Louis.

On July 7, 2010; the Galaxy traveled up northwest to take on the defending Open Cup champions, Seattle Sounders FC in Tukwila, Washington. In front of a sold-out crowd of 4,500 at Starfire Complex, the Galaxy would lose 2–0, the loss to the eventual champions ended their brief Open Cup campaign.

2010–11 CONCACAF Champions League 

Puerto Rico Islanders won 5–3 on aggregate.

International friendlies

Notes

External links

LA Galaxy seasons
Los Angeles Galaxy
Los Angeles Galaxy
Los Angeles Galaxy
2010